2013–14 Raiffeisen Superliga is the fifteenth season of top-tier football in Kosovo. The season begun on 23 August 2013. FC Prishtina are the defending champions.

A total of 12 teams competed in the league: 10 sides from the 2012–13 season and two promoted from the Liga e Parë campaign. Fushë Kosova,  and Ferizaj were each demoted from the top flight.

Teams 
There are 12 competing in the 2013–14 Football Superleague of Kosovo. Last season, Liria and Vëllaznimi were relegated to the Liga e Parë. Ferizaj and Fushë Kosova were promoted.

League table

Results

Matches 1–22

Matches 23–33

Relegation play-offs 
The relegation play-offs took place on 3–4 June 2015. Both the top tier teams, Feronikeli and Trepça, won their ties against second tier Gjilani and Llapi to keep their place in the Superleague.

External links 
 www.futbol24.com
 www.mediavision-ks.com

Football Superleague of Kosovo seasons
1
Kosovo